The 2015–16 Basketligan season was the 23rd season of the Basketligan, the top tier basketball league on Sweden. The season started on 15 October 2015 and ended on 28 April 2016. Södertälje Kings was the defending champion, and successfully reclaimed its title. In the Finals, Södertalje had a clean sweep over Norrköping 4–0 to capture its 11th title.

Competition format
The participating teams first play a conventional round-robin schedule with every team playing each opponent three times for a total of 30 games. The top eight teams qualified for the championship playoffs.

Current teams

Regular season

Playoffs

Awards
On 4 April 2016, Joakim Kjellbom of Norrköping Dolphins won his third Basketligan MVP Award. Skyler Bowlin of Södertälje Kings won the Basketligan Finals MVP.

References

External links
Official Basketligan website

Basketligan seasons
Sweden
Basketligan